The 2008–09 New York Knicks season was the 63rd season of the franchise in the National Basketball Association (NBA).

Key dates
Patrick Ewing was selected for induction into the Naismith Memorial Basketball Hall of Fame in early September. Ewing headlined a class that included fellow legends Hakeem Olajuwon, former Knicks coach Pat Riley, Adrian Dantley, Cathy Rush, Dick Vitale and Bill Davidson.
June 26: The 2008 NBA draft took place in New York City.
July 1: Start of free agency period.
November 21: Mardy Collins and Zach Randolph traded to Los Angeles Clippers for Tim Thomas and Cuttino Mobley. Traded Jamal Crawford to Golden State Warriors for Al Harrington.
February 19: Traded Jerome James, Anthony Roberson and Tim Thomas to Chicago Bulls for Larry Hughes. Traded Malik Rose to Oklahoma City Thunder for Chris Wilcox.
February 25: Waived Stephon Marbury.

Draft picks

Roster

Standings

Game log

|- bgcolor="#bbffbb"
| 1
| October 29
| Miami
| 
| Jamal Crawford (29)
| David Lee (11)
| Nate Robinson (7)
| Madison Square Garden19,763
| 1–0
|- bgcolor="#ffcccc"
| 2
| October 31
| @ Philadelphia
| 
| Jamal Crawford (14)
| David Lee (11)
| Chris Duhon (7)
| Wachovia Center11,717
| 1–1

|- bgcolor="#ffcccc"
| 3
| November 2
| Milwaukee
| 
| Quentin Richardson (28)
| Zach Randolph (13)
| Nate Robinson, Jamal Crawford (4)
| Madison Square Garden18,190
| 1–2
|- bgcolor="#bbffbb"
| 4
| November 5
| Charlotte
| 
| Zach Randolph (25)
| Zach Randolph (13)
| Chris Duhon (6)
| Madison Square Garden17,977
| 2–2
|- bgcolor="#bbffbb"
| 5
| November 7
| @ Washington
| 
| Jamal Crawford (23)
| Zach Randolph (13)
| Chris Duhon (12)
| Verizon Center20,173
| 3–2
|- bgcolor="#bbffbb"
| 6
| November 9
| Utah
| 
| Jamal Crawford (32)
| Zach Randolph (14)
| Chris Duhon (9)
| Madison Square Garden19,344
| 4–2
|- bgcolor="#ffcccc"
| 7
| November 11
| @ San Antonio
| 
| Jamal Crawford (28)
| Zach Randolph (13)
| Chris Duhon (7)
| AT&T Center16,569
| 4–3
|- bgcolor="#bbffbb"
| 8
| November 12
| @ Memphis
| 
| Wilson Chandler (27)
| Zach Randolph (10)
| Jamal Crawford (8)
| FedExForum10,129
| 5–3
|- bgcolor="#bbffbb"
| 9
| November 14
| Oklahoma City
| 
| Jamal Crawford, Zach Randolph (29)
| Zach Randolph (19)
| Chris Duhon (8)
| Madison Square Garden18,008
| 6–3
|- bgcolor="#ffcccc"
| 10
| November 16
| Dallas
| 
| Zach Randolph (27)
| Zach Randolph (18)
| Chris Duhon (12)
| Madison Square Garden19,271
| 6–4
|- bgcolor="#ffcccc"
| 11
| November 18
| @ Boston
| 
| Wilson Chandler (23)
| Zach Randolph (8)
| Chris Duhon (5)
| TD Banknorth Garden18,624
| 6–5
|- bgcolor="#ffcccc"
| 12
| November 21
| @ Milwaukee
| 
| Chris Duhon (20)
| David Lee (12)
| Chris Duhon, Nate Robinson, Wilson Chandler (4)
| Bradley Center14,898
| 6–6
|- bgcolor="#bbffbb"
| 13
| November 22
| Washington
| 
| Quentin Richardson (34)
| Quentin Richardson, David Lee (12)
| Chris Duhon (11)
| Madison Square Garden19,763
| 7–6
|- bgcolor="#ffcccc"
| 14
| November 25
| Cleveland
| 
| Quentin Richardson (22)
| David Lee (13)
| Chris Duhon (6)
| Madison Square Garden19,763
| 7–7
|- bgcolor="#ffcccc"
| 15
| November 26
| @ Detroit
| 
| Al Harrington (25)
| David Lee (15)
| Chris Duhon (9)
| The Palace of Auburn Hills22,076
| 7–8
|- bgcolor="#bbffbb"
| 16
| November 29
| Golden State
| 
| David Lee (37)
| David Lee (21)
| Chris Duhon (22)
| Madison Square Garden19,317
| 8–8

|- bgcolor="#ffcccc"
| 17
| December 2
| Portland
| 
| Chris Duhon (23)
| David Lee (12)
| Chris Duhon (13)
| Madison Square Garden18,664
| 8–9
|- bgcolor="#ffcccc"
| 18
| December 3
| @ Cleveland
| 
| Al Harrington (20)
| David Lee (16)
| Anthony Roberson, Chris Duhon (4)
| Quicken Loans Arena20,562
| 8–10
|- bgcolor="#ffcccc"
| 19
| December 5
| @ Atlanta
| 
| Al Harrington (27)
| David Lee (11)
| Chris Duhon (8)
| Philips Arena16,366
| 8–11
|- bgcolor="#bbffbb"
| 20
| December 7
| Detroit
| 
| Chris Duhon (25)
| David Lee (19)
| Chris Duhon (9)
| Madison Square Garden19,763
| 9–11
|- bgcolor="#ffcccc"
| 21
| December 9
| @ Chicago
| 
| Al Harrington (28)
| David Lee (15)
| Chris Duhon (14)
| United Center19,519
| 9–12
|- bgcolor="#bbffbb"
| 22
| December 10
| @ New Jersey
| 
| Al Harrington (39)
| Al Harrington (13)
| Chris Duhon (10)
| Izod Center16,722
| 10–12
|- bgcolor="#bbffbb"
| 23
| December 13
| @ Sacramento
| 
| Al Harrington (33)
| David Lee (19)
| Chris Duhon (5)
| ARCO Arena12,155
| 11–12
|- bgcolor="#ffcccc"
| 24
| December 15
| @ Phoenix
| 
| Nate Robinson (27)
| David Lee (12)
| Chris Duhon (9)
| US Airways Center18,422
| 11–13
|- bgcolor="#ffcccc"
| 25
| December 16
| @ L.A. Lakers
| 
| Nate Robinson (33)
| David Lee (14)
| Chris Duhon (11)
| Staples Center18,997
| 11–14
|- bgcolor="#ffcccc"
| 26
| December 19
| Milwaukee
| 
| Nate Robinson (21)
| David Lee (14)
| Chris Duhon (7)
| Madison Square Garden19,009
| 11–15
|- bgcolor="#ffcccc"
| 27
| December 21
| @ Boston
| 
| Quentin Richardson (29)
| David Lee (8)
| Chris Duhon (10)
| TD Banknorth Garden18,624
| 11–16
|- bgcolor="#ffcccc"
| 28
| December 26
| Minnesota
| 
| Al Harrington, Nate Robinson (26)
| David Lee (13)
| Chris Duhon (5)
| Madison Square Garden19,763
| 11–17
|- bgcolor="#ffcccc"
| 29
| December 28
| Denver
| 
| Nate Robinson (20)
| David Lee (12)
| Chris Duhon (11)
| Madison Square Garden19,763
| 11–18
|- bgcolor="#bbffbb"
| 30
| December 30
| @ Charlotte
| 
| Wilson Chandler (19)
| David Lee (16)
| Chris Duhon (8)
| Time Warner Cable Arena15,108
| 12–18

|- bgcolor="#ffcccc"
| 31
| January 2
| Indiana
| 
| Al Harrington (27)
| David Lee (11)
| Chris Duhon (7)
| Madison Square Garden19,763
| 12–19
|- bgcolor="#bbffbb"
| 32
| January 4
| Boston
| 
| Wilson Chandler (31)
| David Lee (14)
| Chris Duhon (5)
| Madison Square Garden19,763
| 13–19
|- bgcolor="#ffcccc"
| 33
| January 6
| @ Oklahoma City
| 
| Al Harrington (21)
| David Lee (13)
| Chris Duhon (6)
| Ford Center18,487
| 13–20
|- bgcolor="#ffcccc"
| 34
| January 8
| @ Dallas
| 
| Chris Duhon (24)
| David Lee (15)
| Chris Duhon (7)
| American Airlines Center19,779
| 13–21
|- bgcolor="#ffcccc"
| 35
| January 10
| @ Houston
| 
| Tim Thomas (18)
| David Lee (11)
| Chris Duhon (6)
| Toyota Center18,280
| 13–22
|- bgcolor="#bbffbb"
| 36
| January 12
| @ New Orleans
| 
| David Lee (24)
| Al Harrington (10)
| Chris Duhon (9)
| New Orleans Arena16,177
| 14–22
|- bgcolor="#bbffbb"
| 37
| January 14
| Washington
| 
| David Lee (30)
| David Lee (10)
| Chris Duhon (9)
| Madison Square Garden18,020
| 15–22
|- bgcolor="#ffcccc"
| 38
| January 16
| @ Washington
| 
| Al Harrington (18)
| David Lee (21)
| Chris Duhon (8)
| Verizon Center17,526
| 15–23
|- bgcolor="#ffcccc"
| 39
| January 17
| Philadelphia
| 
| Al Harrington (26)
| David Lee (11)
| Nate Robinson (7)
| Madison Square Garden19,408
| 15–24
|- bgcolor="#bbffbb"
| 40
| January 19
| Chicago
| 
| Quentin Richardson (24)
| David Lee (10)
| Chris Duhon, Nate Robinson, David Lee (3)
| Madison Square Garden18,807
| 16–24
|- bgcolor="#bbffbb"
| 41
| January 21
| Phoenix
| 
| David Lee (25)
| David Lee (16)
| Chris Duhon (7)
| Madison Square Garden19,256
| 17–24
|- bgcolor="#bbffbb"
| 42
| January 23
| Memphis
| 
| David Lee (19)
| David Lee (14)
| Chris Duhon (7)
| Madison Square Garden18,391
| 18–24
|- bgcolor="#ffcccc"
| 43
| January 24
| @ Philadelphia
| 
| Nate Robinson (26)
| David Lee (10)
| Nate Robinson (6)
| Wachovia Center19,239
| 18–25
|- bgcolor="#bbffbb"
| 44
| January 26
| Houston
| 
| Nate Robinson (19)
| David Lee (13)
| Chris Duhon (11)
| Madison Square Garden19,155
| 19–25
|- bgcolor="#bbffbb"
| 45
| January 28
| Atlanta
| 
| Nate Robinson (24)
| David Lee (16)
| Chris Duhon (11)
| Madison Square Garden18,180
| 20–25
|- bgcolor="#bbffbb"
| 46
| January 31
| @ Indiana
| 
| Al Harrington (31)
| David Lee (17)
| Chris Duhon (7)
| Conseco Fieldhouse15,067
| 21–25

|- bgcolor="#ffcccc"
| 47
| February 2
| L.A. Lakers
| 
| Al Harrington (24)
| David Lee (12)
| Chris Duhon (9)
| Madison Square Garden19,763
| 21–26
|- bgcolor="#ffcccc"
| 48
| February 4
| Cleveland
| 
| Al Harrington (39)
| Al Harrington (13)
| Chris Duhon (5)
| Madison Square Garden19,763
| 21–27
|- bgcolor="#ffcccc"
| 49
| February 6
| Boston
| 
| Al Harrington (27)
| David Lee (18)
| Chris Duhon (7)
| Madison Square Garden19,763
| 21–28
|- bgcolor="#ffcccc"
| 50
| February 8
| @ Portland
| 
| David Lee (29)
| David Lee (11)
| Chris Duhon (10)
| Rose Garden20,609
| 21–29
|- bgcolor="#ffcccc"
| 51
| February 10
| @ Golden State
| 
| Nate Robinson (30)
| David Lee (11)
| Chris Duhon (9)
| Oracle Arena19,098
| 21–30
|- bgcolor="#ffcccc"
| 52
| February 11
| @ L.A. Clippers
| 
| Nate Robinson (33)
| David Lee (12)
| Nate Robinson (15)
| Staples Center16,928
| 21–31
|- bgcolor="#bbffbb"
| 53
| February 17
| San Antonio
| 
| Nate Robinson (32)
| David Lee (12)
| Chris Duhon (8)
| Madison Square Garden19,763
| 22–31
|- bgcolor="#bbffbb"
| 54
| February 20
| Toronto
| 
| Wilson Chandler (32)
| David Lee (15)
| Nate Robinson (7)
| Madison Square Garden19,763
| 23–31
|- bgcolor="#ffcccc"
| 55
| February 22
| @ Toronto
| 
| Al Harrington (31)
| David Lee (15)
| Nate Robinson (8)
| Air Canada Centre19,800
| 23–32
|- bgcolor="#bbffbb"
| 56
| February 23
| Indiana
| 
| Nate Robinson (41)
| David Lee (13)
| Chris Duhon (5)
| Madison Square Garden17,283
| 24–32
|- bgcolor="#ffcccc"
| 57
| February 25
| Orlando
| 
| Nate Robinson (32)
| David Lee (10)
| Chris Duhon (10)
| Madison Square Garden19,763
| 24–33
|- bgcolor="#ffcccc"
| 58
| February 27
| Philadelphia
| 
| Larry Hughes (25)
| David Lee (11)
| Chris Duhon (6)
| Madison Square Garden19,763
| 24–34
|- bgcolor="#ffcccc"
| 59
| February 28
| @ Miami
| 
| Nate Robinson (29)
| David Lee (13)
| Chris Duhon (9)
| American Airlines Arena19,600
| 24–35

|- bgcolor="#bbffbb"
| 60
| March 4
| Atlanta
| 
| Larry Hughes (23)
| David Lee (14)
| Chris Duhon (5)
| Madison Square Garden18,931
| 25–35
|- bgcolor="#ffcccc"
| 61
| March 7
| Charlotte
| 
| Al Harrington (24)
| Quentin Richardson (9)
| Nate Robinson, Larry Hughes (4)
| Madison Square Garden19,763
| 25–36
|- bgcolor="#ffcccc"
| 62
| March 8
| @ New Jersey
| 
| David Lee (19)
| David Lee (14)
| David Lee (7)
| Izod Center18,846
| 25–37
|- bgcolor="#bbffbb"
| 63
| March 10
| @ Milwaukee
| 
| Larry Hughes (39)
| David Lee (18)
| Nate Robinson (7)
| Bradley Center13,781
| 26–37
|- bgcolor="#bbffbb"
| 64
| March 11
| @ Detroit
| 
| Nate Robinson (30)
| David Lee (18)
| Nate Robinson (6)
| The Palace of Auburn Hills20,135
| 27–37
|- bgcolor="#bbffbb"
| 65
| March 13
| @ Minnesota
| 
| Nate Robinson (25)
| David Lee (13)
| Nate Robinson (7)
| Target Center14,311
| 28–37
|- bgcolor="#ffcccc"
| 66
| March 15
| @ Cleveland
| 
| Al Harrington (26)
| David Lee (14)
| Nate Robinson (7)
| Quicken Loans Arena20,562
| 28–38
|- bgcolor="#ffcccc"
| 67
| March 18
| New Jersey
| 
| Al Harrington (21)
| Wilson Chandler (10)
| Larry Hughes (5)
| Madison Square Garden19,763
| 28–39
|- bgcolor="#ffcccc"
| 68
| March 20
| Sacramento
| 
| Nate Robinson (19)
| Chris Wilcox (9)
| Nate Robinson, Wilson Chandler (3)
| Madison Square Garden19,763
| 28–40
|- bgcolor="#ffcccc"
| 69
| March 21
| @ Orlando
| 
| Quentin Richardson (33)
| Wilson Chandler (12)
| Nate Robinson, Jared Jeffries, Wilson Chandler, Al Harrington (3)
| Amway Arena17,461
| 28–41
|- bgcolor="#ffcccc"
| 70
| March 23
| Orlando
| 
| Nate Robinson (19)
| David Lee (13)
| Nate Robinson (6)
| Madison Square Garden19,763
| 28–42
|- bgcolor="#ffcccc"
| 71
| March 25
| L.A. Clippers
| 
| Al Harrington (38)
| David Lee (13)
| Chris Duhon (10)
| Madison Square Garden19,041
| 28–43
|- bgcolor="#bbffbb"
| 72
| March 27
| New Orleans
| 
| Al Harrington (23)
| David Lee (11)
| Chris Duhon (7)
| Madison Square Garden19,763
| 29–43
|- bgcolor="#ffcccc"
| 73
| March 28
| @ Charlotte
| 
| Al Harrington, Wilson Chandler (18)
| David Lee (10)
| Chris Duhon (8)
| Time Warner Cable Arena19,133
| 29–44
|- bgcolor="#ffcccc"
| 74
| March 30
| @ Utah
| 
| Al Harrington (24)
| David Lee (10)
| Chris Duhon (7)
| EnergySolutions Arena19,911
| 29–45
|- bgcolor="#ffcccc"
| 75
| March 31
| @ Denver
| 
| Nate Robinson (30)
| David Lee (12)
| Chris Duhon (11)
| Pepsi Center17,851
| 29–46

|- bgcolor="#ffcccc"
| 76
| April 4
| Toronto
| 
| Al Harrington, Chris Duhon (22)
| Al Harrington, David Lee (7)
| David Lee (6)
| Madison Square Garden19,763
| 29–47
|- bgcolor="#bbffbb"
| 77
| April 5
| @ Toronto
| 
| Wilson Chandler (17)
| David Lee, Al Harrington (10)
| Nate Robinson (7)
| Air Canada Centre18,879
| 30–47
|- bgcolor="#ffcccc"
| 78
| April 7
| @ Chicago
| 
| Wilson Chandler (26)
| David Lee (13)
| David Lee, Chris Duhon (6)
| United Center20,764
| 30–48
|- bgcolor="#ffcccc"
| 79
| April 8
| Detroit
| 
| Al Harrington (26)
| Wilson Chandler (8)
| Nate Robinson, Chris Duhon (4)
| Madison Square Garden19,763
| 30–49
|- bgcolor="#bbffbb"
| 80
| April 10
| @ Orlando
| 
| Al Harrington (27)
| David Lee (16)
| Chris Duhon, Al Harrington, David Lee (4)
| Amway Arena17,461
| 31–49
|- bgcolor="#ffcccc"
| 81
| April 12
| @ Miami
| 
| Wilson Chandler, Al Harrington (21)
| David Lee (11)
| Larry Hughes, Nate Robinson (4)
| American Airlines Arena19,600
| 31–50
|- bgcolor="#bbffbb"
| 82
| April 15
| New Jersey
| 
| Wilson Chandler (16)
| David Lee (12)
| Chris Duhon (6)
| Madison Square Garden19,763
| 32–50

Player statistics

Season

|-
| 
| style="background:#ff7518;color:black;" | 82 || 70 || 33.4 || .431 || .328 || .795 || 5.4 || 2.1 || 0.87 || 0.91 || 14.4
|-
| †
| 9 || 0 || 8.3 || .348 || .000 || .444 || 0.9 || 1.1 || 0.22 || 0.00 || 2.2
|-
| †
| 11 || 11 || 35.6 || .432 || style="background:#ff7518;color:black;" | .455 || .761 || 1.5 || 4.4 || 0.82 || 0.00 || 19.6
|-
| 
| 2 || 0 || 11.5 || .300 || .250 || style="background:#ff7518;color:black;" | 1.000 || 2.0 || 0.5 || 0.50 || 0.00 || 4.5
|-
| 
| 3 || 0 || 4.0 || style="background:#ff7518;color:black;" | 1.000 || .000 || .333 || 1.3 || 0.0 || 0.00 || 0.00 || 1.7
|-
| 
| 79 || style="background:#ff7518;color:black;" | 78 || style="background:#ff7518;color:black;" | 36.8 || .422 || .391 || .856 || 3.1 || style="background:#ff7518;color:black;" | 7.2 || 0.91 || 0.09 || 11.1
|-
| 
| 28 || 2 || 14.7 || .448 || .444 || .963 || 2.0 || 0.5 || 0.50 || 0.14 || 6.1
|-
| †
| 68 || 51 || 35.0 || .446 || .362 || .804 || 6.3 || 1.4 || 1.19 || 0.32 || style="background:#ff7518;color:black;" | 20.7
|-
| †
| 25 || 14 || 27.5 || .390 || .385 || .794 || 2.6 || 2.4 || style="background:#ff7518;color:black;" | 1.44 || 0.20 || 11.2
|-
| 
| 2 || 0 || 5.0 || .375 || .000 || .000 || 1.5 || 0.0 || 0.50 || 0.50 || 3.0
|-
| 
| 56 || 36 || 23.4 || .440 || .083 || .611 || 4.1 || 1.4 || 0.84 || 0.59 || 5.3
|-
| 
| 81 || 74 || 34.9 || .549 || .000 || .755 || 11.7 || 2.1 || 0.99 || 0.27 || 16.0
|-
| †
| 2 || 0 || 4.5 || .400 || .000 || .500 || 1.0 || 0.0 || 0.00 || 0.50 || 2.5
|-
| †
| 11 || 11 || 35.3 || .434 || .292 || .821 || style="background:#ff7518;color:black;" | 12.5 || 1.4 || 1.18 || 0.27 || 20.5
|-
| 
| 72 || 51 || 26.3 || .393 || .365 || .761 || 4.4 || 1.6 || 0.65 || 0.10 || 10.2
|-
| †
| 23 || 0 || 11.0 || .379 || .338 || style="background:#ff7518;color:black;" | 1.000 || 0.7 || 0.8 || 0.43 || 0.04 || 4.7
|-
| 
| 74 || 11 || 29.9 || .437 || .326 || .841 || 3.9 || 4.1 || 1.28 || 0.08 || 17.2
|-
| †
| 18 || 0 || 8.9 || .268 || .000 || .727 || 1.7 || 0.6 || 0.06 || 0.06 || 1.7
|-
| †
| 2 || 0 || 4.0 || .000 || .000 || .000 || 1.0 || 0.0 || 0.00 || 0.00 || 0.0
|-
| †
| 1 || 0 || 6.0 || .500 || .000 || style="background:#ff7518;color:black;" | 1.000 || 5.0 || 0.0 || 0.00 || style="background:#ff7518;color:black;" | 1.00 || 3.0
|-
| †
| 1 || 0 || 11.0 || .500 || .000 || .000 || 4.0 || 0.0 || 0.00 || 0.00 || 6.0
|-
| †
| 36 || 1 || 21.5 || .461 || .421 || .806 || 3.1 || 1.3 || 0.61 || 0.28 || 9.6
|-
| †
| 25 || 0 || 13.2 || .529 || .000 || .509 || 3.3 || 0.6 || 0.32 || 0.20 || 5.4
|}
†Statistics with the New York Knicks

Awards and records

Awards

Records

Transactions

Trades

Free agents

Additions

Subtractions

See also
2008–09 NBA season

References

New York Knicks seasons
New York Knicks
2008 in sports in New York City
2009 in sports in New York City
2000s in Manhattan
Madison Square Garden